Coyote Moon is an original novel based on the American television series Buffy the Vampire Slayer.

Book summary

During the summer vacation in Sunnydale, California, the carnival has come to town. At the carnival Willow Rosenberg and Xander Harris hook up with two carnies, but Buffy Summers senses something evil about them. She thinks it has something to do with the sudden influx of coyotes in the area. Eventually Buffy learns that the carnies are skin-walkers and that they are in town to raise Spurs Hardaway, their old master, from his grave in one of Sunnydale's cemeteries. Buffy has to stop these werecoyotes before Willow and Xander become their victims.

External links

Reviews
Litefoot1969.bravepages.com - Review of this book by Litefoot
Teen-books.com - Reviews of this book
Nika-summers.com - Review of this book by Nika Summers
Shadowcat.name - Review of this book

1998 American novels
1990s horror novels
Books based on Buffy the Vampire Slayer
Coyotes in popular culture
Novels by John Vornholt
Novels set in California
Pocket Books books
Fiction about shapeshifting
Native American mythology in popular culture